Mira Creek is a ghost town in Valley County, Nebraska, in the United States.

History
A post office was established at Mira Creek in 1877, and remained in operation until it was discontinued in 1904. It was named from the Mira Creek nearby.

References

Geography of Valley County, Nebraska